The term All-in rate is used in both Construction and the Financial sector. It essentially just means "full costs charged for a service".

Financial Definition 
In general finance terminology, an all-in rate is the rate that a financial institution uses in charging customers for accepting bankers' acceptances, consisting of the bankers' acceptance rate (here considered as actually an amount of money, not an amount of money per unit of time, although it may happen to coincide with a rate per unit of time if the time to maturity happens to equal the unit of time used to calculate the rate) plus the commission.

Construction Estimate Definition 
In construction terminology, an all-in rate is the total cost of an item including all direct and indirect costs for that item. These costs would include the gross hourly cost of employing the site operative, based upon the standard working week for the country, including items such as insurances, statutory contributions and taxes. The all-in labour rate for the Middle East includes the cost of importing labour and for food and accommodation.

Example: All-In Labor Rate = (Total Direct Cost of Labor + Total Indirect Cost of Labor) / Total work hours

References

Banking
Building engineering